Yang Zezhi (Chinese: 杨泽志; pinyin: Yáng Zézhì; born 11 February 1991) is a Chinese footballer who currently plays for Chinese club Changchun Shenhua. He is the first player born after 1990 to score in the Chinese Super League.

Club career
Yang started his professional football career in 2008 when he was promoted to Chengdu Blades's first squad. He made his senior debut on 10 May 2008, in a 1–1 home draw against Qingdao Jonoon, coming on as a substitute for Zhao Mingxin in the 66th minute. He scored his first goal eight minutes later, which made him the first player born after 1990 to score in the Chinese Super League.

On 19 February 2014, Yang transferred to Super League club Hangzhou Greentown. In July 2014, Yang was loaned to China League Two side Guizhou Zhicheng for half season. He was released at the end of 2014.

In March 2016, Yang was signed by China League Two side Sichuan Longfor.

Career statistics 
Statistics accurate as of match played 24 July 2019.

References

External links
 

1991 births
Living people
Sportspeople from Chengdu
Association football midfielders
Chinese footballers
Footballers from Sichuan
Chengdu Tiancheng F.C. players
Zhejiang Professional F.C. players
Guizhou F.C. players
Sichuan Longfor F.C. players
Chinese Super League players
China League One players